The Tugela River is the largest river in KwaZulu-Natal Province, South Africa.

The river originates in Mont-aux-Sources of the Drakensberg Mountains at an elevation of almost 11,000 feet and plunges 947 metres down the Tugela Falls. The Mont-aux-Sources is also the origin of tributaries of two other major South African rivers, the Orange and the Vaal. From the Drakensberg range, the Tugela follows a  route through the KwaZulu-Natal midlands before flowing into the Indian Ocean. Land uses in the catchment are mainly rural subsistence farming and commercial forestry.

Tributaries

The Tugela has a number of tributaries coming off the Drakensberg, the largest being the Mzinyathi ("Buffalo") River (rising near Majuba Hill), but also the Little Tugela River, Klip River (rising near Van Reenen Pass), Mooi River, Blood River, Sundays River (rising in the Biggarsberg) Ingagani River and Bushman River.

The Blood River was named by the Boers, led by Andries Pretorius, after they defeated the Zulu king Dingane on 16 December 1838, when the river is said to have run red with the blood of Zulu warriors. Below the Blood River is Rorke's Drift, a crossing point and a battle site, in the Anglo-Zulu War.

Ecology
The scaly yellowfish (Labeobarbus natalensis) is found in the Tugela River System. It is a common endemic fish in KwaZulu-Natal Province and it is found in different habitats between the Drakensberg foothills and the coastal lowlands, including rivers such as the Umkomazi.

Spelling
The spelling Tugela was used for most of the twentieth century; it is an Anglicised version of the Zulu name Thukela. Nineteenth-century writers adopted a variety of spellings including:
Isaacs (1836) used a number of different spellings in his book, Travels and Adventures in Eastern Africa, including Ootergale and Ootoogale.
C.R. Maclean (John Ross), writing in the Nautical Magazine in 1853, used the spelling Zootagoola
Angus, a nineteenth-century artist, used the name Tugala on the captions to his sketches.

Some of the variations can be accounted for by the early European writers being unaware that Zulu grammar uses prefixes, often a "i-" or a "u-", to denote the noun class of a noun.

See also
List of rivers in South Africa

Dams on the Tugela
Driel Barrage Dam
Spioenkop Dam
Woodstock Dam

Notes

External links

Tugela River
Rivers of KwaZulu-Natal